Harry Bruce, Ph.D, is a Professor and former Dean of the  Information School at the University of Washington. His research interests focus on human information behavior, information seeking, personal information management, and networked information environments. He has authored, co-authored, or edited several books on information behavior and information science, and has published over 30 refereed journal articles and conference papers.

Books authored
 The User's View of the Internet

Books edited
 Emerging Frameworks and Methods: Proceedings of the Fourth International Conference on Conceptions of Library and Information Science (CoLIS 4)

External links
 Harry Bruce's faculty web page at the University of Washington

Year of birth missing (living people)
Living people
University of Washington faculty